Lake Francis Case is a large reservoir impounded by Fort Randall Dam on the Missouri River in south-central South Dakota, United States. The lake is the eleventh-largest reservoir in the United States and is located within the counties of: Charles Mix, Gregory, Lyman, Brule, and Buffalo. The lake stretches from Pickstown, South Dakota upstream to Big Bend Dam.

The reservoir is named for former United States Senator Francis Higbee Case, of South Dakota.

History
The Fort Randall Dam and concomitant reservoir were authorized by the Flood Control Act of 1944 and built next to a historic 1856 military base: Fort Randall. The dam began construction by the Army Corps of Engineers in 1946, and in 1954, its operation was inaugurated by then-President Dwight D. Eisenhower. The resulting reservoir, Lake Francis Case, flooded White Swan, a Native American settlement that had existed along the river. The population of the community was forced to move elsewhere, with many settling in Lake Andes, South Dakota. Lake Andes, nevertheless, experiences flooding.

Fish and wildlife
Species of fish in the reservoir include walleye, northern pike, sauger, sunfish, yellow perch, common carp, black bullhead, channel catfish, and smallmouth bass.

Big game animals around the lake include whitetail and mule deer, coyotes and wild turkeys. Waterfowl and upland game birds include ducks, geese, pheasants, prairie chickens, and grouse. The Karl E. Mundt National Wildlife Refuge is located just downstream of the lake, as a sanctuary for wintering bald eagles. Bald eagles are commonly spotted around the dam during winter months.

Recreation
The South Dakota Department of Game, Fish, and Parks (GFP) maintains several Lakeside Use Areas for lake access around the lake. In addition, the GFP operates seven State Recreation Areas on Lake Francis Case: 
 North Point Recreation Area, near Pickstown
 Randall Creek Recreation Area, near Pickstown
 Pease Creek Recreation Area, near Geddes
 North Wheeler Recreation Area, near Geddes
 Platte Creek Recreation Area, near Platte
 Snake Creek Recreation Area, near Platte on South Dakota Highway 44
 Buryanek Recreation Area, near Burke
 American Creek Campground, near Chamberlain (City of Chamberlain Park)

Lake crossings
Several major highways cross Lake Francis Case. South Dakota Highway 44 crosses over the lake between rural Charles Mix County and Gregory County on the longest bridge in South Dakota, and Interstate 90 crosses the reservoir between Chamberlain and Oacoma.

See also
List of lakes in South Dakota

External links
U.S. Army Corps of Engineers - Fort Randall Project
Lake Francis Case Map, U.S. Army Corps of Engineers

References

Francis Case
Francis Case
Chamberlain, South Dakota
Protected areas of Brule County, South Dakota
Protected areas of Charles Mix County, South Dakota
Protected areas of Gregory County, South Dakota
Protected areas of Lyman County, South Dakota
Bodies of water of Brule County, South Dakota
Bodies of water of Charles Mix County, South Dakota
Bodies of water of Gregory County, South Dakota
Bodies of water of Lyman County, South Dakota